The Benguet bush warbler (Locustella seebohmi), also known as the Benguet grasshopper-warbler, is a songbird species. Formerly placed in the "Old World warbler" assemblage, it is now placed in the newly recognized family Locustellidae. L. seebohmi was formerly known as russet bush warbler, but that name is now restricted to L. mandelli, formerly included in L. seebohmi as a subspecies but now considered a separate species. It is found in the mountains of northern Luzon in the Philippines.

Description 
EBird describes the bird as "A fairly small, slender bird of lower montane grassy valleys. Warm brown above and on the belly, with a white throat and a faintly streaked grayish chest. Note indistinct pale brow and pale barring across the base of the undertail. Very skulking. Similar to Long-tailed Bush-Warbler, but has shorter tail and grayish rather than deep brown underparts. Also similar to Philippine Bush-Warbler but with less distinct pale eyebrow. Song is a sequence of piercing and grating ringing notes repeated at regular intervals."

Habitat and conservation status 
It is found to steep grass valleys in montane areas from 800 to 1,800 meters above sea level.  It appears to be limited to drier areas, and has been found in areas both with or without pine trees. Little else is known about this bird. 

IUCN has assessed this bird as least-concern with the population believed to be stable.

There is a need for surveys to determine whether this species is  rare and possibly threatened or whether it is just widely overlooked. Studies of its habitat associations and tolerance of degraded areas are needed.

References

Benguet bush warbler
Birds of Luzon
Benguet bush warbler
Taxonomy articles created by Polbot

pt:Bradypterus seebohmi